Twisted Metal: Small Brawl is a vehicular combat video game developed by Incognito Entertainment and published by Sony Computer Entertainment for the PlayStation. Santa Monica Studio assisted on development. It was released in North America on November 26, 2001. Twisted Metal: Small Brawl is the sixth installment in the Twisted Metal series of video games.

Gameplay

Twisted Metal: Small Brawl is a vehicular combat game in which the player takes control of one of twelve unique remote control vehicles. While in control of a vehicle, the player can accelerate, steer, brake, reverse, activate the turbo, turn tightly, toggle between and activate weapons using the game controller's d-pad, analog sticks and buttons.

Development
Tentatively titled Twisted Metal Kids during production, the game was announced under the title at a press event for Twisted Metal: Black in Santa Monica, California on March 2, 2001. The official title of Twisted Metal: Small Brawl was revealed at the Electronic Entertainment Expo on May 16. The game utilizes a physics engine based on what was used in Twisted Metal 2: World Tour.

Reception

Twisted Metal: Small Brawl received mixed reviews from critics. Trevor Rivers of GameSpot concluded that "some will immediately be turned away by the graphics and others by the more childish design, but if your PlayStation is still kicking, you might want to check it out". Play Magazine speculated that "this must be where Martha Stewart's evil siblings reside". The Badger of GameZone noted that the graphics felt "very unfinished" and the changes included in the game "[lacked] any real depth". Official U.S. PlayStation Magazine said that the game "isn't a bad game by any means, but it feels like a definite step in the wrong direction". GamePro said that the gameplay was "laboriously slow" and that "there's no real sense of speed". Mark Fujita of IGN remarked that the game's graphics, sound, gameplay and level design were all worse than previous Twisted Metal titles, criticizing the graphics as "appalling" and the menus as "horrendous". Kraig Kujawa of Electronic Gaming Monthly cited the "plumber's ass that sticks out from underneath the sink in the kitchen level" as the best feature in the game, while Shane Bettenhausen warned that "series veterans won't be impressed", and Christian Nutt dismissed the game as "a slapdash, sloppy and unimaginative retrofit". Andy McNamara of Game Informer remarked that the game "doesn't even live up to the first four PSX titles in the series".

Notes

References

External links
 

2001 video games
Incognito Entertainment games
Multiplayer and single-player video games
North America-exclusive video games
PlayStation (console) games
PlayStation (console)-only games
Santa Monica Studio games
Sony Interactive Entertainment games
Twisted Metal
Vehicular combat games
Video games developed in the United States